Malachy Sheridan (13 February 1966 – December 2002) was an Irish bobsledder. He competed in the two man event at the 1992 Winter Olympics. Prior to competing at the Olympics, Sheridan was a pole vaulter and decathlete, and was the British AAA champion in the decathlon in 1985.

References

External links
 

1966 births
2002 deaths
Irish male bobsledders
Olympic bobsledders of Ireland
Bobsledders at the 1992 Winter Olympics
Place of birth missing